German submarine U-424 was a Type VIIC U-boat of Nazi Germany's Kriegsmarine during World War II.

She carried out two patrols. She was a member of four wolfpacks. She did not sink or damage any ships.

She was sunk by British warships southwest of Ireland on 11 February 1944.

Design
German Type VIIC submarines were preceded by the shorter Type VIIB submarines. U-424 had a displacement of  when at the surface and  while submerged. She had two shafts and two  propellers.

U-424 was fitted with five  torpedo tubes (four fitted at the bow and one at the stern), fourteen torpedoes, one  SK C/35 naval gun, 220 rounds, and two twin  C/30 anti-aircraft guns. The boat had a complement of between forty-four and sixty.

Service history
The submarine was laid down on 16 April 1942 at the Danziger Werft (yard) at Danzig (now Gdansk), as yard number 125, launched on 28 November and commissioned on 7 April 1943 under the command of Oberleutnant zur See Günter Lüders.

She served with the 8th U-boat Flotilla from 7 April 1942 and the 1st flotilla from 1 October 1943.

Patrols and loss
The boat's first patrol was preceded by a trip from Kiel in Germany to Trondheim in Norway. U-424 then left Trondheim on 22 October 1943 and headed for the Atlantic Ocean via the gap between Iceland and the Faroe Islands, arriving in Brest in occupied France on 15 December.

Her second sortie began on 29 January 1944.

Fifty men went down with the U-boat; there were no survivors.

Wolfpacks
U-424 took part in four wolfpacks, namely:
 Eisenhart 2 (9 – 15 November 1943) 
 Schill 3 (18 – 22 November 1943) 
 Weddigen (22 November – 7 December 1943) 
 Igel 2 (3 – 11 February 1944)

References

Bibliography

External links

German Type VIIC submarines
U-boats commissioned in 1943
U-boats sunk in 1944
U-boats sunk by depth charges
U-boats sunk by British warships
1942 ships
Ships built in Danzig
Ships lost with all hands
World War II submarines of Germany
World War II shipwrecks in the Atlantic Ocean
Maritime incidents in February 1944